Svileuva is a village, located in the Koceljeva municipality, in Mačva District of Serbia. In 2011, the population of the village was 1,464.

History 

The Svileuva area was first mentioned by Roman sources from I to IV A.D. in the Sirmium district. Svileuva is a significant archaeology site from the Roman imperial period. After the Second World War, 21,000 Roman coins were discovered in one excavation.

Svileuva was an important city in the Serbian Uprisings, where the Serbs defeated an Ottoman faction.

Historical population

1948: 2,734
1953: 2,897
1961: 2,875
1971: 2,589
1981: 2,462
1991: 2,274
2002: 1,807
2011: 1,464

References

See also

List of places in Serbia

Populated places in Mačva District
Roman towns and cities in Serbia
Archaeological sites in Serbia